The Minister-President of Flanders is the head of the Flemish Government, which is the executive branch of the Flemish Region and Flemish Community.

The incumbent officeholder is Jan Jambon, who took over from Liesbeth Homans, the interim minister-president, following the 2019 Belgian regional elections. A new agreement to form a government between the three same parties, the New Flemish Alliance (N-VA), Christian Democratic and Flemish (CD&V) and the Open Flemish Liberals and Democrats (Open Vld), was obtained on 30 September 2019. The ministers were sworn in on 2 October 2019. The government consists of nine ministers, four for the N-VA, three for CD&V and two for the Open Vld.

Appointment
Following the election of the Flemish Parliament, a Flemish Government is formed with a maximum of eleven ministers. The largest party in the government coalition may choose the minister-president. Following the oath of office of all ministers before the Flemish Parliament, the minister-president alone takes the oath of office before the King as well.

Regional elections are held every 5 years. The Flemish Parliament was elected directly for the first time in 1995. Prior to 1995, the members of the Flemish Parliament were the members of the Dutch language group of the Federal Parliament of Belgium.

List of officeholders

Timeline

See also
 Prime Minister of Belgium
 Minister-President of the Brussels Capital-Region
 Minister-President of the French Community
 Minister-President of the German-speaking Community
 Minister-President of Wallonia
 Politics of Flanders
 Flemish Parliament
 Flemish Government

References

1981 establishments in Belgium
Politics of Flanders
Lists of political office-holders in Belgium